Bégin Military Teaching Hospital is a military hospital at 69, avenue de Paris, in Saint-Mandé in the Val-de-Marne, near Paris. It is named after Louis Jacques Bégin, military surgeon of the French Empire.

History
Bégin Military Teaching Hospital was created by the order of Napoleon III on April 21, 1855, to help treat the wounded in the Crimean War. It helped support the Val-de-Grâce hospital which experienced difficulties in accommodating all of the injured. The hospital was inaugurated on May 31, 1858, under the name of hôpital militaire de Vincennes (Vincennes military hospital). It was built on the former site of the royal menagerie of Vincennes Castle.

References

Military hospitals in France
Teaching hospitals in France
Health facilities that treated Ebola patients